Dušan "Koja" Kojić (born 14 June 1961) is a Serbian rock bassist, singer, and songwriter. He is the frontman of the Serbian Alternative rock band Disciplin A Kitschme (formerly known as Disciplina Kičme).

Discography

With Šarlo Akrobata

Singles 
 "Mali čovek" / "Ona se budi" (1981)

Studio albums 
Bistriji ili tuplji čovek biva kad... (1981)

Compilation albums 
Paket aranžman (1980) - with Električni orgazam and Idoli

Other appearances 
Svi marš na ples! (1981)

With Disciplina Kičme

Solo works 
 Prijateljstvo zanat najstariji (1991) - EP
 Kako je propao rokenrol (1989) - with Vlada Divljan and Srđan Gojković
 Beogradska prevara! (2001)
 Kao da je bilo nekad...(posvećeno Milanu Mladenoviću) (2002) - with the band Nova Moćna Organizacija

References 

 EX YU ROCK enciklopedija 1960-2006,  Janjatović Petar;  

1961 births
Living people
Musicians from Belgrade
Serbian rock bass guitarists
Serbian rock singers
Serbian punk rock musicians
Yugoslav rock singers
Post-punk musicians
Serbian record producers